Bright is a given name. Notable people with the given name include:

Given name
 Bright Addae, Ghanaian footballer
 Bright Allotey, Ghanaian footballer
 Bright Edomwonyi, Nigerian footballer
 Bright Enobakhare, Nigerian footballer
 Bright Esieme, Nigerian footballer
 Bright Gyamfi, Ghanaian footballer
 Bright Igbinadolor, Nigerian footballer
 Bright Matonga, Zimbabwean politician
 Bright Nxumalo, Swazi footballer
 Bright Phiri, Zimbabwean cricketer
 Bright Rwamirama, Ugandan politician
 Bright Samuel, English footballer
 Bright Sheng, Chinese-American composer
 Bright Silas, Nigerian footballer
 Bright Simons, Ghanaian social innovator
 Bright Sodje, English rugby player
 Bright Tetteh Ackwerh, Ghanaian artist
 Bright Williams, New Zealand veteran
 Bright Wireko-Brobby, Ghanaian politician

Middle name
 Edgar Bright Wilson, American chemist
 Edgar Bright Wilson (politician), American politician
 Edward Bright Vedder, American physician
 Georgia Bright Engel, American actress
 Harold Bright Maynard, American engineer
 Helen Bright Clark, British activist
 James Bright Morgan, American politician
 Joan Bright Astley, British military writer
 John Bright Banister, British physician
 Joy Bright Hancock, American veteran
 Margaret Bright Lucas, British temperance activist
 Nathaniel Bright Emerson, American physician
 Priscilla Bright McLaren, British activist
 Thomas Bright Crosse, British politician

Nickname
 Vachirawit Chiva-aree ("Bright"), Thai actor

See also
 Bright (surname)
 Bert (name)

References

Masculine given names